A primary alcohol is an alcohol in which the hydroxy group is bonded to a primary carbon atom. It can also be defined as a molecule containing a “–CH2OH” group.
In contrast, a secondary alcohol has a formula “–CHROH” and a tertiary alcohol has a formula “–CR2OH”, where “R” indicates a carbon-containing group.

Examples of primary alcohols include ethanol and 1-butanol.

Methanol is also generally regarded as a primary alcohol, including the 1911 edition of the Encyclopædia Britannica,.

See also
 Alcohol (especially Nomenclature section for discussion on Secondary and Tertiary alcohols.)
 Oxidation of primary alcohols to carboxylic acids

References